John West, 2nd Earl De La Warr (9 May 1729 – 22 November 1777) was a British peer, politician and army officer.

Early life
Born The Honourable John West, he was the son of John West, 7th Baron De La Warr and his first wife, the former Lady Charlotte McCarthy (1700–1734/5). His younger brother was George Augustus West (who married Lady Mary Grey, eldest daughter of Harry Grey, 4th Earl of Stamford and Lady Mary Booth, only daughter of George Booth, 2nd Earl of Warrington). His two sisters were Lady Henrietta Cecilia West (the wife of Gen. James Johnston) and Lady Diana West (the wife of Lt.-Gen. Sir James John Clavering). After the death of his mother, his father remarried to Anne Neville, Lady Bergavenny (widow of George Neville, 1st Baron Bergavenny), daughter of sea captain Nehemiah Walker, in June 1744.

His father was the only son of John West, 6th Baron De La Warr and the former Margaret Freeman (the daughter and heiress of John Freeman of London). His mother was the only daughter of Donough MacCarthy, 4th Earl of Clancarty and Lady Elizabeth Spencer (second daughter of Robert Spencer, 2nd Earl of Sunderland).

Career
In 1746, West entered the army as an ensign in the 3rd Infantry Guards, rising to Lt.-Col., with the 1st Troop of Horse Guards 1755 and to colonel in 1758. From 1760 to 1761, he served as aide-de-camp to the King George III and was promoted to major general in 1761. In 1761, West's father was created Earl De La Warr and Viscount Cantelupe, enabling West to use the latter as a courtesy title. From 1761 to 1766, Cantelupe was Vice to Chamberlain to Queen Charlotte and he was Captain and Colonel of the 1st Troop Horse Grenadier Guards from 1763 to 1766.

After inheriting his father's titles in 1766, he became Master of the Horse to Queen Charlotte and Captain and Colonel of His Majesty's Own Troop of Horse Guards, serving in both roles until his death in 1777. In 1768, he became Lord Chamberlain to Queen Charlotte and in 1770, he was promoted to lieutenant general of the British Army.

Personal life
On 8 August 1756, West married Mary Wynyard (died 1784), daughter of the late Lieutenant-General John Wynyard and the former Catherine Allestrec. Together, they were the parents of two daughters and three sons, including:

 William Augustus West, 3rd Earl De La Warr (1757–1783), who died unmarried.
 John Richard West, 4th Earl De La Warr (1758–1795), who married Catherine Lyell, daughter of Henry Lyell, a Swedish nobleman who had emigrated to England.
 Frederick West (1767–1852), who married Charlotte Mitchell, daughter and co-heiress of Richard Mitchell of Culham Court, in 1792. After her death in 1795, he married Maria Myddelton, sister and co-heiress of Richard Myddelton and second daughter of Richard Myddelton of Chirk Castle and Elizabeth Rushout (daughter of Sir John Rushout, Bt, Treasurer of the Navy) in 1798. She died in 1843.
 Lady Georgiana West (d. 1832), who married Edward Pery Buckley and mother of Edward Pery Buckley, MP for Salisbury.
 Lady Matilda West (d. 1843), who married Gen. Henry Wynyard, Commander-in-Chief, Scotland.

Lord De La Warr died in Audley Square in Mayfair, London on 22 November 1777 and was buried in St. Margaret's, Westminster on 30 November that year. His titles passed to his eldest son, William.

References

External links
John West, 2nd Earl de la Warr (1729-1777), General at the National Portrait Gallery, London

1729 births
1777 deaths
British Life Guards officers
2
John West, 02 Earl De La Warr
British Army lieutenant generals
Members of the British Royal Household
Burials at St Margaret's, Westminster